Joseba Muguruza Bengoa (born 11 January 1994) is a Spanish professional footballer who plays for CE Sabadell FC. Mainly a right back, he can also play as a right winger.

Club career
Muguruza was born in Deba, Gipuzkoa, Basque Country, and was a Real Sociedad youth graduate. In 2013, after finishing his formation, he was loaned to Tercera División side Oiartzun KE for the season.

Upon returning from loan, Muguruza was assigned to the reserves in Segunda División B. On 23 June 2017, he renewed his contract with Sanse for a further year, but left the club on 31 May 2018.

On 29 August 2018, Muguruza signed a three-year contract with CD Castellón also in the third division. Converted into a right back by manager Óscar Cano, he contributed with three goals in 30 appearances during the 2019–20 campaign, as his side achieved promotion to Segunda División.

Muguruza made his professional debut on 12 September 2020, starting in a 2–1 away win against SD Ponferradina.

References

External links

1994 births
Living people
Sportspeople from Gipuzkoa
Spanish footballers
Footballers from the Basque Country (autonomous community)
Association football defenders
Association football wingers
Segunda División players
Segunda División B players
Tercera División players
Real Sociedad B footballers
CD Castellón footballers
CE Sabadell FC footballers